Bud(dy) Green(e) may refer to:

Bud Green (1897–1981), Austrian-born songwriter
Buddy Green (American football), American football coach
Buddy Greene, American musician